Anguilla is a British overseas territory in the Caribbean.

Anguilla may also refer to:

 Anguilla, Georgia
 Anguilla, Mississippi
 Anguilla, United States Virgin Islands
 , a British Royal Navy frigate in commission from 1943 to 1946
 Anguilla Cays, a group of islands on Cay Sal Bank in the Bahamas
 Anguilla, the only genus in the eel family Anguillidae

See also